Joe Torry is an American actor and comedian.

Filmography

Film

Television

References

External links

Joe Torry's Giving Back the Love Foundation

Year of birth missing (living people)
Place of birth missing (living people)
Living people
African-American male actors
American male film actors
American male screenwriters
American stand-up comedians
American male television actors
21st-century American comedians
21st-century American screenwriters
21st-century American male writers
21st-century African-American writers
20th-century African-American people
African-American male writers